South Rock Island Township is located in Rock Island County, Illinois. As of the 2010 census, its population was 18,407 and it contained 8,951 housing units. South Rock Island Township formed from Rock Island Township on March 1, 1878.

Geography

Demographics

References

External links
 South Rock Island Township (official website)
City-data.com
Illinois State Archives

Townships in Rock Island County, Illinois
Townships in Illinois